Caenopedina alanbakeri is a species of sea urchins of the Family Pedinidae. Their armour is covered with spines. Caenopedina alanbakeri was first scientifically described in 1989 by Rowe.

References

Animals described in 1989
Pedinoida